Terra de Melide is a comarca in the Galician Province of A Coruña. The overall population of this  local region was 11,872 (2019).

Municipalities
Melide, Santiso, Sobrado and Toques.

References

Comarcas of the Province of A Coruña